The 2015 Philippine Basketball Association (PBA) rookie draft was an event which allows teams to draft players from the amateur ranks. The event was held at the Midtown Atrium, Robinsons Place Manila on August 23, 2015. From this draft on, the league abandoned its lottery system after the controversies that surrounded the previous year's draft. Instead, the league determined the drafting order based on the performance of the member teams for the 2014–15 season, with the worst team picking first.

Draft order
The draft order was determined based from the overall performance of the teams from the previous season. The Philippine Cup final ranking comprises 40% of the points, while the rankings of the Commissioner's and Governors' Cups will comprise 30% each.

Draft

1st round

2nd round

(Rain or Shine passed. Their first of two unused picks originally belonged to Meralco.)

3rd round

4th round

(Ginebra and Meralco passed.)

5th round

(Barako Bull, Star, San Miguel, Alaska passed.)

6th round

(GlobalPort and Talk 'N Text passed.)

7th round

8th round

(Mahindra and NLEX passed.)

Trades involving draft picks

Pre-draft trades
  On October 9, 2014, Talk 'N Text acquired a first round pick from Blackwater in a three-team trade with NLEX.
  On October 4, 2014, Rain or Shine acquired a 2015 first round pick from NLEX in exchange for the draft rights to Kevin Alas.
  On January 31, 2013, Meralco acquired a 2015 first round pick, Rey Guevarra, Vic Manuel, and Josh Vanlandingham from GlobalPort in exchange for Sol Mercado, Kelly Nabong, Jaypee Belencion, and Yousif Aljamal.
  On March 31, 2015, Ginebra acquired a first round pick from Barako Bull in exchange for James Forrester and Dylan Ababou.
  On July 25, 2014, NLEX acquired a 2015 first round pick from Ginebra in exchange for Joseph Yeo.
  On October 9, 2014, Blackwater acquired Larry Rodriguez and a first round pick from Talk 'N Text in a three-team trade with NLEX.
  On July 25, 2014, NLEX acquired a 2015 first round pick from San Miguel in exchange for a 2016 first round pick.
  
  On February 3, 2015, Ginebra acquired a second round pick and Dorian Peña from Barako Bull in a three-team trade with San Miguel. Previously, the Energy acquired the pick and RR Garcia on June 24, 2014, from GlobalPort in exchange for Keith Jensen.
  On August 18, 2015, Rain or Shine acquired a second round pick and Jewel Ponferada from GlobalPort in exchange for Jervy Cruz. Previously, the Batang Pier acquired the pick and Ronjay Buenafe on June 4, 2014, from Barako Bull in exchange for Nico Salva and Bonbon Custodio.
  On August 31, 2012, Alaska acquired JVee Casio and a 2015 second round pick from Ginebra in exchange for LA Tenorio in a five-team trade with Barako Bull, GlobalPort, and Petron (San Miguel).
  On September 6, 2011, Barako Bull acquired a second round pick and Don Allado from Star (as B-Meg) in a three-team trade with Shopinas.com/Air21 (NLEX). 
  On November 3, 2013, Alaska acquired a 2015 second round pick from Talk 'N Text in exchange for the draft rights to John Paul Erram (see 2013 PBA draft).
  On December 10, 2014, San Miguel acquired Dennis Miranda and a 2015 second round pick from Barako Bull in exchange for Sol Mercado.
  On August 19, 2012, Rain or Shine acquired a 2015 second round pick from Meralco in exchange for the draft rights to Kelly Nabong.

Draft-day trades
Note: No trades were allowed during the draft day as requested by incoming commissioner Chito Narvasa.

Undrafted players

Note: *Backed out due to not playing in the PBA D-League; eventually drafted in 2016 by Meralco.

References

External links
 PBA.ph

Philippine Basketball Association draft
Draft
PBA draft